Michael Terry, FRGS, FRGSA (3 May 1899 – 1981) was an Australian explorer, surveyor, prospector and writer.

Biography 
Terry was born at Gateshead, County Durham, England. During the First World War he served with No. 2 Squadron of the RNAS Armoured Cars in Russia against the Bolsheviks, by whom he was captured at Kursk though subsequently released. He moved to Australia in 1918. Between 1923 and 1935 he led fourteen, mainly gold prospecting, expeditions through inland Australia; he wrote several books and articles in Walkabout, about his experiences.

Bibliography
 1925 - Across Unknown Australia: a thrilling account of exploration in the Northern Territory of Australia. Herbert Jenkins: London
 1927 - Through a Land of Promise: with gun, car and camera in the heart of Northern Australia. Herbert Jenkins: London
 1931 - Hidden Wealth and Hiding People. Putnam: London
 1932 - Untold Miles: three gold-hunting expeditions amongst the picturesque borderland ranges of Central Australia. Selwyn & Blount: London
 1937 - Sand and Sun: two gold-hunting expeditions with camels in the dry lands of Central Australia. Michael Joseph: London
 1945 - Bulldozer: the war role of the Department of Main Roads, New South Wales. Frank Johnson: Sydney
 1974 - War of the Warramullas. Rigby: Adelaide. 
 1987 - The last explorer: the autobiography of Michael Terry, FRGS, FRGSA. Australian National University Press: Rushcutters Bay, New South Wales.

See also
 Australian outback literature of the 20th century
 Ben Nicker

References

 Bright Sparcs biographical entry on Michael Terry

Australian explorers
20th-century Australian non-fiction writers
Date of death missing
People from Gateshead
1899 births
1981 deaths
Place of death missing
Fellows of the Royal Geographical Society
British emigrants to Australia